Mouyondzi Airport  was an airstrip  east of the town of Mouyondzi, in the Bouenza Department of the Republic of the Congo. The land is now under cultivation.

References

External links
OpenStreetMap - Mouyondzi Airport
Mouyondzi - Google Maps - 7/20/4014

Defunct airports
Airports in the Republic of the Congo